Sporting Portugal Fund is a Portuguese football investment fund dedicated on Sporting CP players. It was managed by "ESAF – Espírito Santo Fundos de Investimento Mobiliário S.A.". At first the fund had 3,000,000 units with €5 each.

FIFA did not allowed third parties to have "significant" influence on players, which in reverse minority interest was not banned. Sporting closed its relation to previous investment fund in 2007, but "Sporting Clube de Portugal – Futebol, SAD", the company that operation football section of the athletic club, had a negative equity of €29.646 million in 2010–11 season. Co-current with issue bonds, re-capitalization, Sporting had to find an alternative way to improve the financial condition. Benfica had set up a successful Benfica Stars Fund which purchased around €40M from the club. The club gave up a portion of future transfer fee received in return. After months of preparation, Sporting announced the fund would start operate in August 2011.

In August 2011, Sporting announced that the fund had a size of €15 million and opened to subscription. On 18 August, Sporting started to sell new signing, current players and youth product to the fund for cash.

Investments

See also
 Third-party ownership in association football

References

External links
 Entry at CMVM 

Association football organizations